James Deacon may refer to:

Jimmy Deacon (1906–1976), Scottish footballer
James the Deacon, Italian deacon who accompanied Paulinus of York on his mission to Northumbria
James Deacon (artist) (died 1750), English miniature painter